CERAWeek is an annual energy conference organized by the information and insights company S&P Global in Houston, Texas. The conference provides a platform for discussion on a range of energy-related topics; CERAWeek 2019 featured sessions on the world economic outlook, geopolitics, energy policy and regulation, climate change and technological innovation, among other topics. The conference features prominent speakers from energy, policy, technology, and financial industries, and is chaired by Pulitzer Prize winner Daniel Yergin, vice-chairman, IHS Markit and Jamey Rosenfield, vice chair, CERAWeek, senior vice president, IHS Markit. Both are co-founders of Cambridge Energy Research Associates.

The 39th annual CERAWeek conference, scheduled for March 9 to 13, 2020, in Houston, Texas, was canceled.

Speakers and Attendees
CERAWeek attracts executives, government officials and thought leaders from the energy, policy, technology, and financial industries to Houston each year. In 2019, there were over 5,500 delegates from over 1,000 organizations representing 85 countries. These include over 650 CEOs and Chairmen, over 1,400 C-Suite executives and over 90 ministers and government representatives. Participants encompass all regions and industry segments: oil, natural gas, electric power, coal, nuclear and renewables; as well as technology, finance, mobility and more. 

Recent Speakers at CERAWeek have included:

President Bill Clinton 
President George W. Bush
Prime Minister of Canada Justin Trudeau
Prime Minister of India Narendra Modi
Henry Kissinger, former US Secretary of State 
Nizar Al-Adsani, chairman and managing director, Kuwait Petroleum Corporation
Vagit Alekperov, president and CEO, LUKOIL
Ben Bernanke, former chairman of the US Federal Reserve
Bob Dudley, former chief executive, BP 
Khalid Al-Falih, chief executive, Saudi Aramco
Bill Gates, co-chair, Gates Foundation
John Hess, chairman and CEO, Hess Corporation 
Hon. John Hickenlooper, Governor of Colorado
Walter Isaacson, CEO, Aspen Institute
Jeffrey Immelt, chairman and CEO, General Electric
Joe Kaeser, CEO, Siemens
Hon. John Kasich, Governor of Ohio
Fred Krupp, president, Environmental Defense Fund
Ryan Lance, CEO, ConocoPhillips
Andrew Liveris, chairman and CEO, The Dow Chemical Company
Bernard Looney, CEO, BP
Emilio Lozoya, CEO, Pemex
Helge Lund, president and CEO, Statoil
Christophe de Margerie, chairman and CEO, Total
Gina McCarthy, administrator, US EPA
Ernie Moniz, U.S. Secretary of Energy
Admiral Mike Mullen, former chairman, US Joint Chiefs
Ali Naimi, Minister of Petroleum, Saudi Arabia 
Marvin Odum, president, Shell Oil 
Igor Sechin, executive chairman, Rosneft 
Jeffery Smisek, president and CEO, United Airlines
Rex Tillerson, chairman and CEO, ExxonMobil
Peter Voser, chief executive officer, Royal Dutch Shell
John Watson, chairman and CEO, Chevron
Andrew Wheeler, administrator, US EPA
Baosen Zheng, managing director and group head, State Grid Corporation of China
Jiping Zhou, president, China National Petroleum Co.

CERAWeek’s Energy Innovation Pioneers
Each year at CERAWeek, the Energy Innovation Pioneer program recognizes companies and entrepreneurs whose technologies and business plans have the potential to transform the energy industry's future. Companies are selected based on several criteria, including the feasibility of their plan and scalability of their technology, and are presented at an Energy Insight Breakfast session during the conference. In 2019, CERAWeek recognized 8 pioneers. In 2014, CERAWeek recognized 24 pioneers.

Media Coverage
CERAWeek has been widely covered by the media, including the following news outlets: The Wall Street Journal, The New York Times, Business Week, and Forbes.

References 

Conferences in the United States
Business conferences
Energy organizations